João Marcelo Gaspar Pereira (born 19 February 1992 in Sete Quedas) is a Brazilian cyclist.

Major results

2012
 9th Copa América de Ciclismo
2013
 1st  Road race, National Under-23 Road Championships
 2nd Overall Giro do Interior de São Paulo
1st Prologue & Stage 2
 6th Overall Tour do Rio
1st Mountains classification
1st Young rider classification
2014
 1st Prologue Giro do Interior de São Paulo
 3rd Overall Tour do Brasil
1st  Mountains classification
1st Stage 5
2015
 1st  Mountains classification Istrian Spring Trophy
 1st Mountains classification Tour do Rio
2016
 8th Road race, Pan American Road Championships

References

External links

1992 births
Living people
Brazilian male cyclists
Brazilian road racing cyclists
Cyclists at the 2015 Pan American Games
Pan American Games competitors for Brazil